The 1914 Western Kentucky State Normal football team represented Western Kentucky State Normal School (now known as Western Kentucky University) as an independent during the 1914 college football season.  They were led by head coach J. L. Arthur.

Schedule

References

Western Kentucky State Normal
Western Kentucky Hilltoppers football seasons
Western Kentucky State Normal football